The 2004 season was the Green Bay Packers' 84th in the National Football League (NFL) and their 86th overall. The team started the season by losing four of their first five games, before winning their next six in a row, followed by victories over their three divisional opponents in their last five to finish with a 10–6 record and qualify for the playoffs for the fourth year in a row. As the number three seed in the NFC, they hosted their divisional rivals, the Minnesota Vikings in the Wild Card round, but lost 31–17; it was the second time the Packers had lost a playoff game at Lambeau Field.

Offseason
The Packers did not make many offseason moves, signing safety Mark Roman, cornerback Chris Watson, as well as quarterback Tim Couch who was cut after the preseason. They lost punter Josh Bidwell and safety Antuan Edwards to free agency and released defensive tackle Gilbert Brown, defensive end Jamal Reynolds, and wide receiver Travis Williams.

NFL Draft
With the 25th pick of the 2004 NFL Draft, the Packers selected cornerback Ahmad Carroll from the University of Arkansas.

Undrafted free agents

Personnel

Staff

Roster

Schedule

Game summaries

Week 1

    
    
    
    
    
    

Ahman Green 33 Rush, 119 Yds

Week 2

Week 3

Week 4

Week 5

Week 6

Week 7

Week 8

Week 10

Week 11

Week 12

    
    
    
    
    
    
    
    
    
    

Brett Favre 18/27, 215 Yds, 3 TD (200th start)

Week 13

Week 14

Week 15

Week 16

Week 17

Wild Card

Standings

Season statistical leaders 

 Passing Yards: Brett Favre 4,088 Yards
 Passing Touchdowns: Brett Favre 30 TD
 Rushing Yards: Ahman Green, 1,163 Yards
 Rushing Touchdowns: Ahman Green, 7 TD
 Receiving Yards: Javon Walker, 1,382 Yards
 Receiving Touchdowns: Javon Walker, 12 TD
 Points: Ryan Longwell, 120 points
 Kickoff Return Yards: Antonio Chatman, 565 Yards
 Punt Return Yards: Antonio Chatman, 242 Yards
 Tackles: Nick Barnett, 121 Tackles
 Sacks: Kabeer Gbaja-Biamila, 13.5 Sacks
 Interceptions: Darren Sharper, 4 Interceptions

External links
2004 Packers results and recaps
2004 Packers roster
extended statistics

References

Green Bay Packers
Green Bay Packers seasons
NFC North championship seasons
Green